Dayang may refer to:
 Dayang (honorific), a Bruneian honorific
 a dialect of Sema language, a Sino-Tibetan language
 Dayang Jingxuan, a Buddhist monk during Song Dynasty of China
 Dayang Island, an island in Johor, Malaysia
 Dayang newt, a species of Salamander
 Dayang Motorcycle, a division of Dayun Group